Iceland–Israel relations refers to the diplomatic relations between Iceland and Israel. Both nations are members of the Organisation for Economic Co-operation and Development and the World Trade Organization.

History

Early relations 
One of the first contacts between Iceland and the people of Palestine's region took place in the 1400s when Icelanders (then part of Denmark) partook in the Crusades. The first official relations between modern Iceland and Israel took place on 29 November 1947 when Iceland voted in favor for the Partition of Palestine which led to the creation of the State of Israel. In May 1948 Iceland recognized the State of Israel and established diplomatic relations.

In September 1962, Israeli Prime Minister David Ben-Gurion traveled to Iceland on an official visit and met with Icelandic Prime Minister Ólafur Thors. In November 1964, Icelandic Prime Minister Bjarni Benediktsson paid a visit to Israel and met with Israeli Prime Minister Levi Eshkol. 
In May 1966, Icelandic President Ásgeir Ásgeirsson paid an official visit to Israel and addressed the Knesset.

In September 1992, Israel and the European Free Trade Association (which includes Iceland) signed a free trade agreement.

Two-state solution 
Since the 1990s, Iceland has been a proponent of independence for nations and territories wishing to become independent. The Icelandic government has advocated for a peaceful resolution to the Israeli-Palestinian conflict and has called for international recognition of the State of Palestine. On 30 April 2002 the Althing (Parliament of Iceland) adopted a Parliamentary Resolution where it was demanded “that peace negotiations on the establishment of an independent State of Palestine and the security of the State of Israel within internationally recognised borders should begin”. As a results of this position by the Icelandic government, Israel has expressed its frustration with Iceland.

In 2010, Iceland expressed its condemnation at the United Nations against Israel's raid of the Gaza flotilla and Israel's attack on the Gaza Strip. In November 2011, the Althing approved a resolution recognizing an independent and sovereign State of Palestine within the pre-1967 Six-Day War borders becoming the first western European nation to do so.

In September 2015, the Icelandic capital of Reykjavík voted in favor "of a general boycott of Israeli goods as long as the occupation of the Palestinian territories continues." This was criticized by the Icelandic government. Immediately, the Icelandic Ministry of Foreign Affairs declared that the "decision of Reykjavík was not in line with Iceland's foreign policy nor does it reflect on Iceland's relations with the State of Israel." Within a week, Reykjavik mayor Dagur Eggertsson amended the proposal that the boycott would apply only to products from Israeli settlements.

In 2017, an Israeli technology firm started a commercial food delivery service to Iceland. It is reported to be the world’s first unmanned aerial delivery service. This is not only a gain for proponents of unmanned delivery technology, it also has provided a 60 percent reduction in delivery costs versus delivery by sea or other alternatives and a reduction in delivery times.

Controversies 
During the Eurovision Song Contest 2019, held in Tel Aviv, Icelandic participants Hatari held up scarves with the Palestinian flag on them during the televote.

State visits
Presidential and Prime Ministerial visits from Iceland to Israel

 Prime Minister Bjarni Benediktsson (1964)
 President Ásgeir Ásgeirsson (1966)
 Prime Minister Davíð Oddsson (1992)

Prime Ministerial visits from Israel to Iceland

 Prime Minister David Ben-Gurion (1962)

Diplomatic missions
 Iceland is accredited to Israel directly from the Ministry of Foreign Affairs and maintains an honorary consulate in Tel Aviv.
 Israel is accredited to Iceland from its embassy in Oslo, Norway and maintains an honorary consulate in Reykjavík.

See also
 Dorrit Moussaieff
 History of the Jews in Iceland

References 

 
Israel
Iceland